The 2014 Korea Open Super Series was the first super series tournament of the 2014 BWF Super Series. The tournament took place in Seoul, South Korea from January 7–12, 2014 and had a total purse of $600,000. A qualification was held to fill four places in four of the five disciplines of the main draws.

Men's singles

Seeds

Top half

Bottom half

Finals

Women's singles

Seeds

Top half

Bottom half

Finals

Men's doubles

Seeds

Top half

Bottom half

Finals

Women's doubles

Seeds

Top half

Bottom half

Finals

Mixed doubles

Seeds

Top half

Bottom half

Finals

References

Korea Open (badminton)
Korea Open
Korea Open
Korea Open Super Series
Sport in Seoul